Kosswig's barbel (Luciobarbus kosswigi) is a species of ray-finned fish in the genus Luciobarbus. It is found in the Tigris watershed in Turkey.

References 

 

Luciobarbus
Fish described in 1971